Oxysternon conspicillatum is a species of dung beetle. It is widespread and common in both evergreen and deciduous forests of Central America and northern South America, and generally sticks to lowland, dry tropical and bamboo forests. The larvae feed on fungi, decaying organic matter, and other organic materials found in dung balls or carrion.

Both male and female beetles are hard-shelled with an iridescent blue-green color on their skin. The species exhibits some sexual dimorphism; males have large black horns and spikes on their shells while females' shells are flat. Male O. conspicillatum also tend to be larger than their female counterparts.

Oxysternon conspicillatum has been studied as a potential source for antimicrobial agents, with the possible use of its host defense peptides in the development of new antibiotics.

References

Scarabaeidae
Beetles of Central America
Beetles of South America
Beetles described in 1801